The New York Hakoahs were an American basketball team based in New York, New York that was a member of the American Basketball League. The Hakoahs were predominantly Jewish and were coached by Nat Holman. "Hakoahs" comes from the Hebrew word for "strength."

Year-by-year

References

Hakoah sport clubs
Basketball teams in New York City
Jews and Judaism in New York City
Defunct basketball teams in the United States
Jewish basketball teams